Jofran Frejat (1937 – 23 November 2020) was a Brazilian politician who served as a Deputy.

References

1937 births
2020 deaths
Brazilian politicians